SmartDO  is a multidisciplinary design optimization software, based on the Direct Global Search technology developed and marketed by FEA-Opt Technology. SmartDO specialized in the CAE-Based optimization, such as CAE (computer-aided engineering), FEA (finite element analysis), CAD (computer-aided design), CFD (Computational fluid dynamics) and automatic control, with application on various physics phenomena. It is both GUI and scripting driven, allowed to be integrated with almost any kind of CAD/CAE and in-house codes.

SmartDO focuses on the direct global optimization solver, which does not need much parametric study and tweaking on the solver parameter. Because of this, SmartDO has been frequently customized as the push-button expert system.

History
SmartDO was originated in 1995 by its founder (Dr. Shen-Yeh Chen) during his Ph.D. study in Civil Engineering Department of Arizona State University. During 1998 to 2004, SmartDO was continuously developed and applied on aerospace industry and CAE consulting application as an in-house code. In 2005, Dr. Chen established FEA-Opt Technology as a CAE consulting firm and software vendor.  The first commercialized version 1.0 was published in 2006 by FEA-Opt Technology. In 2012, FEA-Opt Technology signed partner agreement with both ANSYS and MSC Software base on SmartDO.

Process integration
SmartDO uses both GUI and scripting-based interface to integrate with the 3rd party software. The GUI includes general operation of SmartDO and package specific linking interface, called the SmartLink. Smartlink can link with 3rd party CAE software, such as ANSYS Workbench. The user can cross-link any parameters in ANSYS Workbench to any design parameters in SmartDO, such as design variables, objective function, and constraints, and SmartDO will usually solve the problem well with the default settings.

The scripting interface in SmartDO is based on Tcl/Tk shell. This makes SmartDO able to link with almost any kind of 3rd party software and in-house code. SmartDO comes with the SmartScripting GUI, for generating Tcl/Tk script automatically. The user can create script  by answering questions in the SmartScripting GUI, and SmartScripting will generate Tcl/Tk scripts for the user. The flexible scripting interface allows SmartDO to be customized as a push-button automatic design system.

Design optimization
SmartDO uses the Direct Global Search methodology to achieve global optimization, including both Gradient-Based Nonlinear programming and Genetic Algorithm based stochastic programming. These two approaches can also be combined or mixed to solve specific problems.

For all the solvers in SmartDO, there is no theoretical and/or coding restriction on the number of design variables and/or constraints. SmartDO can start from an infeasible design point, pushing the design into the feasible domain first, and then proceed with optimization.

Gradient-Based Nonlinear Programming 

 SmartDO uses the Generalized Reduced Gradient Method and the Method of Feasible Directions as its foundation to solve the constrained nonlinear programming problem. To achieve global search capability, SmartDO also uses  Tunneling and Hill climbing to escape from the local minimum. This also enables SmartDO to eliminate the numerical noise caused by meshing, discretization, and other phenomena during numerical analysis. Other unique technologies include

 Automatic recognition of active constraints. 
 Smart Dynamic Search to automatically adjust search direction and step size.

Genetic Algorithm

 The Genetic Algorithm in SmartDO was part of the founder's Ph.D. dissertation, which is called the Robust Genetic Algorithms. It includes some special approaches to achieve stability and efficiency, for example, 
 Adaptive Penalty Function.
 Automatic Schema Representation.
 Automatic Population and Generation Number Calculation.
 Adaptive and Automatic Cross-Over Probability Calculation.
 Absolute Descent.

Because there are various types of design variables available in the Robust Genetic Algorithms, the users can perform Concurrent Sizing, Shaping and Topology Optimization with SmartDO.

Applications
SmartDO has been widely applied on the industry design and control since 1995. The disciplines and physics phenomena includes
 Structure
 CFD
 Heat Flow
 Heat Transfer
 Crashworthiness
 Structural/Thermal/Electronic Coupled
 Automatic Control

And the application includes
 Life prolonging of semi-conductor component.
 Keratotomy Surgeries.
 Civil structure and resident roof optimization (sizing, shaping and topology).
 Life prolonging and weight reduction for the components of gas turbine engines.
 Enhancement for the performance of the fluid power system.
 Weight reduction and strength increase of the nuclear heavy-duty lifting hook.
 Performance optimization of the shock absorbing mechanism.
 Weight reduction of the air cargo deck.
 Performance optimization of the thermoelectric generator.
 Weight reduction of the lower A-Arm of the armored tank.
 Performance curve optimization for the keyboard rubber dome.
 Performance curve optimization for the connectors.
 Composite structure optimization.
 Strength optimization of the circulation water pump in power plant.
 Structural optimization for the wave energy converter.
 Performance optimization of the jet nozzle.
 Optimization of the O-Ring Sealing for the steel charger.
 Performance Enhancement of the Golf Club Head.
 Crashworthiness Optimization of The Crash Box.
 Ceramic Gas Turbine Engines Rotor Disk Structural Optimization.

References

Notes

 C-Y Tsai, 2010, "Improving the O-ring Sealing of 8 gram Charger by Finite Element Analysis and Shape Optimization", M.S. Thesis, Department of Mechanical Engineering, National Chiao Tung University, Taiwan.
 H-C Tseng, Z-C. Wu, C Hung, M-H. Lee, C-C. Huang, 2009, "Investigation of Optimum Process Parameters on the Sheet Hydroforming of Titanium/Aluminum Clad Metal for Battery Housing", by 4th International Conference on Tube Hydroforming (TUBEHYDRO 2009), September 6–9, Kaohsiung, Taiwan.
 S-Y. Chen, 2007, Gradient-Based Structural and CFD Global Shape Optimization with SmartDO and the Response Smoothing Technology, Proceedings of the 7th World Congresses of Structural and Multidisciplinary Optimization (WCSMO7), COEX Seoul, 21–25 May 2007, Korea
 S-Y. Chen, J. W.C. Liao and V. Tsai, 2007 “Improving the Reliability and Usability of Structural Shaping Optimization –The Contour Natural Shape Function”, Journal of Chinese Institute of Engineers, Vol. 30 (to be published).
 S-Y. Chen, Nov 2002, "Integrating ANSYS with Modern Numerical Optimization Techniques - Part I : Conjugate Feasible Direction Method, 2002 Taiwan Area ANSYS Users Conference.
 S-Y. Chen, Nov 2002, "Integrating ANSYS with Modern Numerical Optimization Techniques - Part II : A Reverse Parametric Modeling Approach for Structural Shaping Optimization, 2002 Taiwan Area ANSYS Users Conference.
 S-Y. Chen, March 2001, "An Approach for Impact Structure Optimization Using The Robust Genetic Algorithm", Finite Elements in Analysis and Design, Vol 37, No 5, pp431–446.
 S-Y. Chen and S. D. Rajan, October 2000, "A Robust Genetic Algorithm for Structural Optimization", Structural Engineering & Mechanics Journal, Vol 10, No 4, pp313–336.
 S-Y. Chen, Oct 2000, "Integrating ANSYS with Modern Numerical Optimization Technologies", ANSYS Solutions Magazine, Spring Issue, 2003.
 S-Y. Chen and S. D. Rajan, May 1999, " Using Genetic Algorithm as An Automatic Structural Design Tool", Short Paper Proceedings of 3rd World Congress of Structural and Multidisciplinary Optimization, Vol. 1, pp263–265, Buffalo, NY.
 B. Mobasher, S-Y.Chen, C. Young and S. D. Rajan, Oct. 1998, "A Cost Based Approach To Design Of Residential Steel Roof Systems", 14th International Specialty Conference, Recent Research and Developments in Cold-Formed Steel Design and Construction, University of Missouri-Rolla, Edited By Wei-Wen Yu and R. LaBoube, pp613–625.
 S-Y. Chen and S.D. Rajan, 1998, "Improving the Efficiency of Genetic Algorithms for Frame Designs", Engineering Optimization, Vol. 30, pp281–307.
 S-Y. Chen, December 1997, "Using Genetic Algorithms for the Optimal Design of Structural System",Dissertation for Doctor of Philosophy, Department of Civil Engineering, Arizona State University.

External links
 FEA-Opt Technology company page.
 Dedicated web page for SmartDO

Computer system optimization software
Computer-aided engineering software
Computer-aided design software
Mathematical optimization software
Simulation software